The Shadiest One is the debut solo studio album by American rapper WC. It was released on April 28, 1998 via Payday/FFRR Records. Recording sessions took place at Backroom Studios in Glendale, at Echo Sound in Los Angeles, at Skip Saylor Recording in California, at Bad Ass Beat Lab in Antioch, at Infinite Studios in Alameda, at The Crackhouse, at Urban House Studios, Inc., and at Can-Am Recorders in Tarzana. Production was handled by DJ Battlecat, Stu-B-Doo, Ant Banks, Barr 9 Productions, Daz Dillinger, Douglas Coleman, Mo-Suave-A, Rick "Dutch" Cousin, Young Tre, DJ Crazy Toones and WC (the latter two also served as executive producers). It features guest appearances from CJ Mac, Daz Dillinger, E-40, Ron Banks, Too $hort, and Westside Connection. The album peaked at number 19 on the Billboard 200 and at number 2 on the Top R&B/Hip-Hop Albums in the United States. Both of its singles, "Just Clownin'" and "Better Days", made it to the Billboard Hot 100 landing at number 56 and 64, respectively.

Track listing

Charts

References

External links

1998 debut albums
WC (rapper) albums
Albums produced by Ant Banks
Albums produced by Daz Dillinger
Albums produced by Battlecat (producer)